Gallions was the name of two distinct railway stations that adjoined the River Thames by Gallions Reach in Beckton, east London.

First station and branch opening
Construction of a line from Custom House to Gallions was authorised by the parliamentary act that also approved the construction of the Royal Albert Dock, and the branch was opened by the London & St. Katharine Docks Company on 3 August 1880 as far as Central. The full line to the first Gallions station, which was the eastern terminus and had two platforms, opened in November 1880.

There were two commercial reasons for building the branch: firstly the size of the docks necessitated a transport link to enable the business of the dock and commuting to and from the docks to be carried out; secondly Albert Dock handled passengers and easier passenger access to the quays were required for ships that left to all parts of the British Empire. This was why a hotel was built adjacent to the first station which is mentioned in the book The Light That Failed by Rudyard Kipling (who stayed at the hotel) where the hero asks a P&O clerk, "Is it Tilbury and a tender or Gallions and the dock?".

Second station
The station was subsequently moved 275 yards further east, reopening on 12 December 1886, to help facilitate the development of the dock. The station was located on a different alignment from the original station with the line diverging at Manor Way station slightly to the north of the original branch.

This station consisted of an island platform with two platform faces: platform 1 was generally used by Great Eastern Railway (GER) services and platform 2 by the shuttle service operated by the dock company towards Custom House. Access to the platforms was from a footbridge at the west end of the station. The tracks continued beyond the end of the platforms to the docks and a pier. In the later years this was operated by William Cory & Son Limited handling coal and employing their own locomotives for shunting. Each platform had a loop line for locomotives to run from one end of the train to the other and a water tower was located at the end of the platforms. The signal box containing 21 working and seven spare levers.

Locomotives
The line was operated by locomotives owned by the dock company and operated from a bay platform at Custom House station. The first locomotives were hired from the construction contractors Lucas and Aird and these were later replaced by three former London and North Western Railway (LNWR) 2-4-0T locomotives. An 1890 photograph of one of these locomotives (former LNWR No. 431 Hercules) shows it carrying Royal Albert Dock on its water tanks. Upon opening, services ran every 30 minutes but by 1881 this had been increased to three trains per hour to meet demand. Later these were supplemented by occasional Liverpool Street services and shorter workings from Stratford (low level platforms) or Stratford Bridge.

Later history and services
On 1 January 1889 the London & St. Katharine Docks Company and the East and West India Docks organisations united and operated as a joint committee before merging in 1901 and becoming the London and Indian Docks Company.

The GER took over operation of all the train services in July 1896 when the three former LNWR locomotives were withdrawn.

Around the turn of the century the line reached its zenith in terms of passengers carried and in 1900 there were 53 weekday services each way. These broke down as:

 35 Custom House  
 16 Fenchurch Street (2 via Bow Road and Stratford Market)  
 2  Stratford/Stratford Market

During World War I Sunday services were withdrawn on 27 June 1915 followed by bank holiday workings in 1918. Early in 1918 a special daily service ran east of the station to a jetty for a connecting service to Woolwich Arsenal which was used by munitions workers. this service ceased at the end of the war.

On 31 March 1909 all remaining London dock companies merged and became the Port of London Authority (PLA) who became responsible for operation of the branch and Gallions station.

In 1923 the GER became part of the London and North Eastern Railway who became responsible for running the trains. Throughout its life the signal boxes and level crossings on the branch were the responsibility of the dock company.

Passenger services continued to decline and in 1932 the shuttle service from Custom House was withdrawn leaving just the remaining through services. At the beginning of World War II the service was further cut back and did not operate between 13:10 Saturday and 07:20 Sundays.

The 1938 timetable showed:
 8 Fenchurch Street (2 via Bow Road and Stratford Market)
 3 Stratford/Stratford Market
 4 Victoria Park

Closure
Following severe bomb damage on the branch on 7 September 1940 the station was closed and a replacement bus service introduced. Goods trains continued to operate to the Royal Docks after the war but over adjacent PLA owned lines.

The Gallions branch was repaired and used by occasional trains to and from Cory's as well as for wagon storage. The Cory's traffic ended in 1967.

The station building at Gallions was probably demolished in the early 1960s 

With the redevelopment of London Docklands in the 1980s and 1990s, the line between Custom House and Manor Way was redeveloped as an extension of the Docklands Light Railway to Beckton, but the final section between Manor Way and Gallions was not used and has since been built over. No trace of Gallions station remains today except the hotel which adjoined the station which served as a public house until 1972 and this included part of the original station platform. Study of photographs of the hotel in 2015 and via Google Earth suggest the area has since been landscaped.

Notes

References

 
 
 
 

Disused railway stations in the London Borough of Newham
Railway stations in Great Britain opened in 1880
Railway stations in Great Britain closed in 1940